The Slovakia national badminton team represents Slovakia in international badminton team competitions. The Slovakian team used to compete as part of Czechoslovakia. The national team was formed after the dissolution of Czechoslovakia in 1992 and after the formation of the Slovak Badminton Federation.

Slovakia competed in the Sudirman Cup until 2019. The national team competes in the European Men's and Women's Team Badminton Championships.

Participation in BWF competitions

Sudirman Cup

Participation in European Team Badminton Championships

Men's Team

Women's Team

Mixed Team

Participation in European Junior Team Badminton Championships
Mixed Team

Current squad 
The following players were selected to represent Slovakia at the 2020 European Men's and Women's Team Badminton Championships.

Male players
Andrej Antoska
Jakub Horak
Miroslav Haring
Milan Dratva
Juraj Vachalek
Boris Karpjak
Lukas Kudlak
Peter Radoczi

Female players
Mia Tarcalová
Lucia Vojteková
Martina Repiská
Katarína Vargová
Júlia Chmurovičová
Alžbeta Peruňská
Natália Tomčová

References

Badminton
National badminton teams
Badminton in Slovakia